The 1952–53 New York Knicks season was the seventh season for the team in the National Basketball Association (NBA). With a 47–23 record, the Knicks won the regular season Eastern Division title by a half-game over the Syracuse Nationals and made the NBA Playoffs for the seventh consecutive year.

In the first round of the 1953 NBA Playoffs, the Knicks swept the Baltimore Bullets 2–0 in a best-of-three series to advance to the Eastern Division Finals. There, New York defeated the Boston Celtics 3–1 to make the NBA Finals for the third straight year. In the Finals, the Knicks lost to the Minneapolis Lakers, four games to one. The club would wait another 17 years to make an NBA championship final, winning it in 1970.

NBA draft

Note: This is not an extensive list; it only covers the first and second rounds, and any other players picked by the franchise that played at least one game in the league.

Regular season

Season standings

x – clinched playoff spot

Record vs. opponents

Game log

Playoffs

|- align="center" bgcolor="#ccffcc"
| 1
| March 17
| Baltimore
| W 80–62
| Connie Simmons (25)
| Madison Square Garden III
| 1–0
|- align="center" bgcolor="#ccffcc"
| 2
| March 20
| @ Baltimore
| W 90–81
| Vince Boryla (20)
| Baltimore Coliseum
| 2–0
|-

|- align="center" bgcolor="#ccffcc"
| 1
| March 25
| Boston
| W 95–91
| Connie Simmons (18)
| Dick McGuire (8)
| Madison Square Garden III
| 1–0
|- align="center" bgcolor="#ffcccc"
| 2
| March 26
| @ Boston
| L 70–86
| Harry Gallatin (17)
| Carl Braun (7)
| Boston Garden
| 1–1
|- align="center" bgcolor="#ccffcc"
| 3
| March 28
| Boston
| W 101–82
| Harry Gallatin (23)
| Dick McGuire (11)
| Madison Square Garden III
| 2–1
|- align="center" bgcolor="#ccffcc"
| 4
| March 29
| @ Boston
| W 82–75
| Carl Braun (18)
| Nat Clifton (9)
| Boston Garden
| 3–1
|-

|- align="center" bgcolor="#ccffcc"
| 1
| April 4
| @ Minneapolis
| W 96–88
| Carl Braun (21)
| —
| Minneapolis Auditorium5,000
| 1–0
|- align="center" bgcolor="#ffcccc"
| 2
| April 5
| @ Minneapolis
| L 71–73
| Connie Simmons (17)
| —
| Minneapolis Auditorium4,848
| 1–1
|- align="center" bgcolor="#ffcccc"
| 3
| April 7
| Minneapolis
| L 75–90
| Connie Simmons (18)
| —
| 69th Regiment Armory5,100
| 1–2
|- align="center" bgcolor="#ffcccc"
| 4
| April 8
| Minneapolis
| L 69–71
| Connie Simmons (17)
| —
| 69th Regiment Armory5,200
| 1–3
|- align="center" bgcolor="#ffcccc"
| 5
| April 10
| Minneapolis
| L 84–91
| Carl Braun (19)
| Ernie Vandeweghe (4)
| 69th Regiment Armory5,200
| 1–4
|-

Player statistics

Season

Playoffs

Awards and records

Transactions

See also
1952–53 NBA season

References

External links
1952–53 New York Knickerbockers Statistics
1953 NBA Playoff Summary

New York Knicks
New York Knicks season
New York Knicks
New York Knicks seasons
1950s in Manhattan
Madison Square Garden